Association Sportive d'Ornans is a French association football club. They are based in the town of Ornans and their home stadium is the Stade André Brey. As of the 2017-18 season, they play in the Regional 1 Bourgogne-Franche-Comté, effectively the sixth level of the French football league system.

External links
 

Sport in Doubs
Football clubs in Bourgogne-Franche-Comté